= Lunardi's =

Lunardi's Markets
- Type: Private
- Founded: 1953; 73 years ago in San Francisco, United States
- Founder: Alfredo Lunardi
- Number of locations: 8 stores (2026)
- Website: lunardis.com

Lunardi's Markets is an American grocery store chain founded in 1953. It operates eight locations in California.

== History ==
In 1953, Alfredo Lunardi (1929–2018) bought the Mother's Market, a local market at 23rd and Irving Street in San Francisco shortly after immigrating to the United States from Italy. It was operated as a family business.

In 2002, Lunardi's opened in San Jose, California, which pleased local residents. However, in 2007, Lunardi's unexpectedly closed, which shocked many residents. A local resident gained 3000 signatures on a petition to reopen Lunardi's.

In 2008, the 8th store opened in Danville, California after the company acquired a former Andronico's market.
